Nisyrus may mean:
 Nisyrus (insect), the genus of stick insects in subfamily Xeroderinae
 Nisyros#Christianity, the Christian diocese.